The Party for Franconia also known as Frankenpartei is a minor party in Germany aimed primarily at people in the Franconian regions of Bayern.

Elections 
In 2013, the party stood for the first time in the Bavarian state election in three states; Upper Franconia, Middle Franconia and Lower Franconia. They got 2.9% of the vote in Upper Franconia, 2.3% in Middle Franconia and 1.6% in Lower Franconia accumulating 2.2% total throughout the franconian states and 0.7% throughout whole Bavaria.

In 2014, they stood in the Bavarian local election for Feucht, Hof and Roth. In Feucht, they got 4.8% gaining them one seat, in Hof they got 5.5% gaining them two seats and in Roth they got 4.4% gaining them one seat.

At the 2018 Bavarian state election they stood again, but compared to 2013 only in Middle Franconia and Lower Franconia. They got significantly less votes compared to 2013 gaining only 1.1% in Middle Franconia and 0.8% in Lower Franconia, which put them at 0.2% throughout Bavaria.

References 

Regionalist parties
Franconia
Political parties established in 2009
Political parties in Germany